Elbistan coalfield, also known as Afşin Elbistan Lignite Reserve, is a large lignite coalfield located in the south-east of Turkey in Kahramanmaraş Province. Elbistan is the field with the most coal in Turkey. Kışlaköy coal mine now mines the field. 200 million tons of CO2 were emitted by burning lignite from this field before 2016, and 2.4 billion tons could be emitted in future. The lignite is high in sulfur and moisture, and only has 1,000 to 1,500 kcal/kg, or less than 5 MJ/kg, which is a quarter of typical thermal coal. The coalfield supplies the Afşin-Elbistan power stations.

References

Sources

External links 
Afşin-Elbistan lignite mines on Global Energy Monitor

Coal mining regions in Turkey
Kahramanmaraş Province
Elbistan
Afşin (district)